Ngāti Pūkenga is a Māori iwi centred in Tauranga in the Bay of Plenty region of New Zealand. Its rohe (tribal area) extends to Mayor Island / Tuhua and Waihi in the north, to the Kaimai Range in the west, south of Te Puke and to Maketu in the east, and it has tribal holdings in Whangarei, Hauraki and Maketu.

Ngāti Pūkenga is part of the Tauranga Moana iwi group, which also includes Ngāi Te Rangi and Ngāti Ranginui. The three iwi all consider Mauao (Mt Maunganui) sacred and share many things in common. Collectively, the iwi are seeking compensation from the New Zealand Government for their losses from the New Zealand Wars but are yet to seek a settlement.

History

Pūkenga is the founding ancestor of the iwi. Pūkenga was of Mātaatua descent, and spent his life in Ruatoki. Upon his death, his people, known as Ngāti Hā, moved east towards Opotiki. This resulted in the displacement of the tribe of Rōmainohorangi. Later, the displaced tribe, now known as Ngāti Te Rangihouhiri, requested the help of Ngāti Hā in battle.

For their assistance, Ngāti Pūkenga, as they were now known, were given land in Tauranga, where their main settlements still stand today. Ngāti Pūkenga also received land given to them in Hauraki, the little village of Manaia, where direct descendants of Ngāti Pūkenga, and Pūkenga himself still remain.

Hapū and marae

The iwi is made up of 8 hapū (sub-tribes): Ngāti Hinemotu, Ngāti Kiorekino, Ngāti Kohokino, Ngāti Te Matau, Ngāti Te Rākau, Ngāti Tōwhare, Ngāti Whakina and Te Tāwera.

The hapū share two marae (meeting grounds) and wharenui (meeting houses):

 Waitao Marae and Te Whetū o Te Rangi wharenui in Tauranga
 Manaia Marae and Te Kou o Rehua wharenui in Manaia

Governance

Te Tāwharau o Ngāti Pūkenga is the governance entity recognised by the New Zealand Government to represent Ngāti Pūkenga following its Treaty of Waitangi settlement with the Crown on 7 April 2013. The trust is governed by one trustee from each of the four kainga: Pakikaikutu, Tokaanu, Manaia, and Tauranga. It is a member of the Hauraki Collective. As of 2016, the chair of the trust is Jocelyn Mikaere-Hollis, the general manager is Areta Gray, and the trust is based in Tauranga.

Ngāti Pūkenga Iwi ki Tauranga Trust is the mandated iwi organisation for Ngāti Pūkenga under the Māori Fisheries Act, an iwi acquaculture organisation in the Māori Commercial Aquaculture Claims Settlement Act, a Tūhono organisation, and the iwi authority representing Ngāti Pūkenga under the Resource Management Act. It is charitable trust governed by six trustees from iwi whānui. As of 2016, the chairperson of the trust is Rehua Smallman and the trust is based in Tauranga.

The iwi has interests in the territory of Bay of Plenty Regional Council, Western Bay of Plenty District Council and Tauranga City Council.

Media

Moana Radio is the radio station of all three iwi. Moana previously operated youth-oriented urban contemporary Tahi FM between 2003 and late 2011.

Notable people

 John Atirau Asher, tribal leader
 Georgina Kingi, school principal
 Katherine Te Rongokahira Parata, tribal elder
 Rahera Te Kahuhiapo, tribal leader
 Joe Williams (judge), Supreme Court Justice

See also
List of Māori iwi

References

External links
Ngāti Pūkenga website

 
Iwi and hapū